Universe is a black-and-white animated documentary short film made in 1960 by the National Film Board of Canada. It "creates on the screen a vast, awe-inspiring picture of the universe as it would appear to a voyager through space. Realistic animation takes you into far regions of space, beyond the reach of the strongest telescope, past Moon, Sun, and Milky Way into galaxies yet unfathomed."

This visualization is grounded in the nightly work of Dr. Donald MacRae, an astronomer at the David Dunlap Observatory in Richmond Hill, Ontario, a facility formerly owned and operated by Toronto University and now operated by the Royal Astronomical Society of Canada. Using the technology of his era, MacRae prepares his largely manually operated equipment and then photographs, by long exposure, one star. He actually strikes an arc between iron electrodes and makes a simultaneous exposure, which he can compare to the star's spectrum to determine its movement relative to Earth.

Douglas Rain did the narration for the English version; the French version was titled Notre univers with narration by Gilles Pelletier. Eldon Rathburn composed the musical score.

Production
Roman Kroitor and Colin Low considered making a film about the universe five years before the launch of Sputnik 1. A budget of $60,000 was requested. Don Mulholland, the Director of Production, wanted the film divided into three parts in order to justify its cost. National Film Board of Canada Commissioner Albert Trueman gave the film $20,000 per year, with them putting the film on hold once they used up their money for that year. The film was not done after three years so more money was given with the requirement that it be completed within the next year. The film was completed on 31 March 1960. The film had a budget of $105,146.

Influence on 2001: A Space Odyssey
After this work, co-director Colin Low worked with Stanley Kubrick on 2001: A Space Odyssey. Kubrick chose narrator Douglas Rain as the voice of the HAL 9000 computer and hired Wally Gentleman, who did optical effects for the NFB documentary, to work on 2001.

According to Kubrick biographer Vincent Lobrutto:

Release
300 prints of the film were ordered by NASA and the NFB sold over 3,100 copies by 1976. It was one of the more widely distributed educational films ever made.

Accolades

References

Works cited

External links
 
 
 

1960 animated films
1960 short films
1960s English-language films
National Film Board of Canada documentaries
BAFTA winners (films)
Films directed by Colin Low (filmmaker)
Canadian animated documentary films
Documentary films about outer space
Black-and-white documentary films
Canadian short documentary films
Astronomy education works
1960 documentary films
Films scored by Eldon Rathburn
Films produced by Tom Daly
National Film Board of Canada animated short films
Films directed by Roman Kroitor
1960s short documentary films
English-language Canadian films
National Film Board of Canada short films
1960s Canadian films
Short Film Palme d'Or winners